Collingwood Warriors Soccer Club, an association football club based in Collingwood, Melbourne, was founded in 1996 in affiliation between Australian Football League club Collingwood and Greek backed former NSL club Heidelberg United, that was then trading as 'Melbourne Warriors'. They were admitted into the National Soccer League for the 1996–97 season. They dissolved in 1997 after the end of the 1996–97 National Soccer League.

Frank Juric held the record for the greatest number of league appearances for Collingwood Warriors. The Australian goalkeeper played 25 times for the club. The club's goalscoring record was held by Con Boutsianis, Kimon Taliadoros and Andrew Vlahos who scored 8 goals in all competitions.

Key
 The list is ordered first by date of debut, and then if necessary in alphabetical order.
 Appearances as a substitute are included.

Players

References
General
 
 

Specific

Lists of soccer players by club in Australia
Melbourne sport-related lists
Association football player non-biographical articles